Said Fazlagić (born 25 January 1969) is a Bosnian retired international footballer who played professionally in Europe and the United States as a left back.

Since 25 December 2009 Said has served as the Director of Sport, International Relations and Capital Projects at the Olympic Committee of Bosnia and Herzegovina.

Club career
Fazlagić played in Europe for FK Sarajevo, FK Željezničar, NK Rovinj and SC Pfullendorf, before signing with  D.C. United in the 1996 MLS Inaugural Player Draft. Fazlagić made two appearances for D.C. United in the 1996 MLS season. After suffering a serious injury, Fazlagić was forced to retire at age 27. Later he served in capacity of Director of Coaching for United 1996 Futbol Club, Louisville, Kentucky from 1997 until 2004.

International career
He made his debut in Bosnia and Herzegovina's first ever official international game, a November 1995 friendly match away against Albania, coming on as a late substitute for Nedžad Fazlagić. It remained his sole international appearance.

References

External links

1969 births
Living people
Footballers from Sarajevo
Association football fullbacks
Yugoslav footballers
Bosnia and Herzegovina footballers
Bosnia and Herzegovina international footballers
FK Sarajevo players
FK Željezničar Sarajevo players
NK Rovinj players
SC Pfullendorf players
D.C. United players
Major League Soccer players
Bosnia and Herzegovina expatriate footballers
Expatriate footballers in Croatia
Bosnia and Herzegovina expatriate sportspeople in Croatia
Expatriate footballers in Germany
Bosnia and Herzegovina expatriate sportspeople in Germany
Expatriate soccer players in the United States
Bosnia and Herzegovina expatriate sportspeople in the United States